Nowe Miasto is one of the districts of the Polish city of Białystok.

History
The area of today's Nowe Miasto got its name in the 1980s but its territory was the location of old settlements such as the village Słoboda. It was founded at the end of the 17th century between today's Ogodną and Świerkową streets. It had about 11–12 houses. Residents were probably exempt from taxes hence the name Sloboda (liberty). In May 1919 the village was included in Greater Bialystok and designated as "garden city" which was then divided into building plots in 1925, an official colony. It is part of the architectural assumption of this colony laid out according to the assumptions of the Garden City. The Central Square of the Garden City is located at the intersection of Kazimierza Pułaskiego Streets (then Żurawie) – the main avenue of the foundation, Wspólna and Strzelecka. After the Second World War, there were about 50 houses in Słoboda.

The Nowe Miasto district was founded at the beginning of the 20th century, hence the distinctive name. The area of the modern Nowe Miasto district was defined by the MRN Resolution in Białystok of November 31, 1959 on the establishment of the districts of the city of Bialystok: composed of Nowe Miasto, Swoboda, Bażantarnia and the former village of Starosielce. The borders run South and Zwierzyniecka Road, Świerkowa, Wiosenna, Zambrowska Road, along the tracks by rail from Bielsko to Southern Road. The former village of Horodniany (now the Nowe Miasto district) bordered on the south from in the village of Starosielce. The southern border of the village of Starosielce with the property of Horodyniany ran along Rzymowskiego, Wschodnia streets with goods Białystok along Zachodnia street. The latter got its name as it was the western border of the Białystok. Further the border ran parallel to Składowa, to Forces of the Border Protection street (Dębowa street before the war) towards Hetmańska street, to today's Popiełuszki street, through the arch through the Zielone Wzgórza District to Rzymowskiego street. Currently, the Nowe Miasto district also includes Kawaleryjska, Świerkowa, Kopernik, Ciołkowski streets (formerly Szosa) to Zielona. These are the areas belonging once to the village of Swoboda (Słoboda).
z

External links

References

Districts of Białystok